The Southern Cross may refer to:

 The Southern Cross (Argentina), an Argentine newspaper by Patrick Joseph Dillon (1842-1889), a Roman Catholic priest, editor, and politician
 The Southern Cross (New Zealand), an Auckland newspaper (1843–1862) that changed its name to The Daily Southern Cross when it became a daily in 1862
 The Southern Cross (South Africa), the national Catholic weekly newspaper of South Africa
 The Southern Cross (San Diego), the official newspaper of the Roman Catholic Diocese of San Diego
 The Southern Cross (South Australia), the official newspaper of the Roman Catholic Diocese of Adelaide
 The Southern Cross (film), a 2003 Argentine film

See also 
 Southern Cross (disambiguation)